Robert Harrison Comber (1816 – 28 May 1858) was an English cricketer who played for Surrey. He was born in Mitcham and died in Nottingham; his precise date of birth is unknown.

Comber made a single first-class appearance, in 1851, against Sussex. Batting as a tailender, he scored 3 runs in the first innings in which he batted and 17 in the second.

External links
Robert Comber at CricketArchive 

1816 births
1858 deaths
English cricketers
Surrey cricketers